Milen Zhelev (Bulgarian: Милен Желев; born 17 July 1993) is a Bulgarian footballer who currently plays as a midfielder for Arda Kardzhali.

Career
On 21 June 2017, Zhelev signed with Beroe.

International career
In November 2016 Zhelev received his first call-up to the senior Bulgaria squad for a match against Belarus, but did not make the final squad for the game.

References

External links
 

1993 births
Living people
Bulgarian footballers
Association football midfielders
First Professional Football League (Bulgaria) players
Akademik Sofia players
PFC Vidima-Rakovski Sevlievo players
FC Lokomotiv Gorna Oryahovitsa players
PFC Beroe Stara Zagora players
FC Arda Kardzhali players
Sportspeople from Stara Zagora